The 2010 edition of R League is reserve league of 2010 K League. 2010 season was held from March 25 to October 7. In this season, Jeju United Reserve and Gangwon FC Reserve participate the league. Each team will be played 14 games in home and away.

League standing

Group League A (GLA)

Group League B (GLB)

Winners

External links
 K League website

R League seasons
2010 in South Korean football